Arene guttata is a species of sea snail, a marine gastropod mollusk in the family Areneidae.

Description

The shell can grow to be 4 mm to 7.5 mm in length.

Distribution
Arene guttata can be found off of the Galápagos Islands and the Cocos Island.

References

External links
 To Biodiversity Heritage Library (3 publications)
 To World Register of Marine Species

Areneidae
Gastropods described in 1970